Ollie Gene Embry (born March 22, 1929) is an American bank robber who was on the FBI's "10 most wanted fugitives" list in 1951.

Bank robbery
Embry robbed the Monroe National Bank in Columbia, Illinois on February 6, 1951. Three others who robbed the bank with him were arrested before he was and given long jail terms. The robbers were Patrick Kane, Ollie Gene Embry and James McAllister. The robbers collected $8855. Driving away in a stolen car, they spread roofing nails on the road. They ran their first car into a ditch and then got into another car. The getaway driver, Frank Daubauch, was later picked up by East St. Louis detectives who noticed him driving a new car in town.

The three other robbers were soon named and police were dispatched to look for them. Kane and McAllister met soon after at the George Washington Hotel in St. Louis to divide the money with Embry. Embry entered the hotel and became suspicious of a man in the lobby. He fled and the other two were soon arrested.

Capture
On August 5, 1951, FBI agents and city detectives captured Ollie Gene Embry while he was working at a gas station as an attendant. He was 22 at the time and was not armed. He surrendered without a struggle. The officers asked him to "check the radiator" on a car. When he raised the hood of the car he was grabbed by agents who said, "So you're Ollie Embry...we're from the FBI." Three officers were in attendance, one of whom was Lee Boardman of the FBI. Embry had been working at the filling station for about two months, when someone on the street recognized him from the FBI posters and called it in. Embry had only been on the most wanted men list for twelve days, having been added on July 23, 1951.

References

1929 births
American bank robbers
FBI Ten Most Wanted Fugitives
Fugitives
Living people
Prisoners and detainees of the United States federal government